John Langton Sanford (1824–1877) was an English historical writer.

Life
Born at Upper Clapton, London, on 22 June 1824, Sanford studied at University College, London. Entering Lincoln's Inn, he read in the chambers of John Richard Quain, and was called to the bar in 1855, but never practised as a barrister.

From 1852 to the end of 1855 Sanford was joint editor of The Inquirer, established as a Unitarian periodical in 1842. From 1861 till his death he contributed to The Spectator. Among his close friends were Walter Bagehot and William Caldwell Roscoe.

For many years Sanford's eyesight was failing, and early in 1875 he became totally blind. After the death of his sister Lucy he moved, in May 1876, from London to Evesham, Worcestershire. He died at Evesham on 27 July 1877, and was buried in the graveyard of Oat Street Chapel.

Works
Sanford wrote:

Studies and Illustrations of the Great Rebellion (1858), some of which had appeared originally in the Christian Reformer, under the signature "Sigma".
The Great Governing Families of England (1865, 2 vols.), written with Meredith Townsend, and originally contributed to The Spectator. 
Estimates of English Kings (1872), also reproduced from The Spectator.

Notes

Attribution

1824 births
1877 deaths
English barristers
English magazine editors
19th-century English historians
19th-century British journalists
British male journalists
English male non-fiction writers
19th-century English male writers
19th-century English lawyers